is a tactical RPG developed by Nippon Computer Systems for the Sega Genesis, and was released in 1992. It was localized for North America and PAL regions by Treco.

Gameplay

Sorcerer's Kingdom allows players to control a party of characters and guide them through dungeons and battles. The game features tactical RPG elements such as turn-based and movement during battle along a grid. Each character can either move, use an item or, spell, defend, or attack an enemy that is next to them when it is their turn. If an enemy is not in an adjacent space, the character can move next to them in order to use a physical attack with their equipped weapon or use a spell to cause damage from a distance.

The game ditches the experience system and allows characters to increase their stats as they battle certain ways. By continually using spells, for instance, a character's magic stat will increase after the enemies in a battle are all defeated. During battle, every enemies may move once for every action any party member makes, leading to enemies having a larger number of attacks than the player's party.

Plot
In the world of Sorcerer's Kingdom, a line of kings have encouraged young men with riches and titles to become adventurers and explore the world. Recently, monsters have begun appearing in villages and it is up to these heroes to defeat them and stop evil from spreading. By collecting all the Spirits of the world, the heroes are able to seal the evil and prevent it from returning.

References

External links

1992 video games
Sega Genesis games
Sega Genesis-only games
Fantasy video games
Tactical role-playing video games
Video games developed in Japan